Frank Waller may refer to:
 Frank Waller (athlete)
 Frank Waller (painter)